(Rejoice, you hearts), BWV66.2, 66,  is a church cantata for Easter by Johann Sebastian Bach. He composed it for the Second Day of Easter in Leipzig and first performed it on 10 April 1724. He based it on his congratulatory cantata , first performed in Köthen on 10 December 1718.

The prescribed readings for the second of three Easter feast days included the narration of the Road to Emmaus. The cantata was Bach's first composition for Easter as Thomaskantor in Leipzig. He derived it from his earlier Serenata, which had a similar celebratory mood. An unknown librettist solved the problem that Bach's congratulatory cantata was a dialogue of tenor and alto by retaining a dialogue in three movements, assigned to Hope and Fear. They represent different attitudes to the news of the Resurrection of Jesus, which may be found in the two disciples, discussing the events on their walk, but also within the listener of the cantata.

Bach structured the cantata in six movements, an exuberant choral opening, a set of recitative and aria for bass, another such set for alto and tenor, and a closing chorale taken from  the medieval Easter hymn "". A Baroque instrumental ensemble included trumpet, two oboes, bassoon, strings and continuo. The music expresses moods of mourning and fear which should be overcome, but especially exhilarating joy.

History and words 
In 1723, Bach was appointed as Thomaskantor (director of church music) in Leipzig. He was employed by the town of Leipzig to this position, which made him responsible for the music at four churches and for the training and education of boys singing in the Thomanerchor. Cantata music had to be provided for two  major churches, Thomaskirche (St. Thomas) and Nikolaikirche (St. Nicholas), simpler church music for two others, Neue Kirche (New Church) and Peterskirche (St. Peter). Bach took office in the middle of the liturgical year, on the first Sunday after Trinity. In his first twelve months in office, Bach decided to compose new works for almost all liturgical events. These works became known as his first cantata cycle.

Erfreut euch, ihr Herzen for the Second Day of Easter ("") is Bach's first composition for Easter in Leipzig, written in his first year in office. The day before, on Easter Sunday of 1724, he had performed , which he had composed much earlier in his career. The new cantata was derived from his earlier secular work, the Serenata  composed in Köthen.

The prescribed readings for the feast day were from the Acts of the Apostles, the sermon of Peter, and from the Gospel of Luke, the Road to Emmaus. An unknown librettist faced the problem that Bach's congratulatory cantata was written as a dialogue of tenor and alto. He kept the dialogue in three movements, in the middle section of the opening chorus and two duets, assigning the "roles" Hope ("", later "") and Fear ("", later "") to the voices. The text reflects these different reactions to the news of the Resurrection of Jesus, which might be attributed both, to the two disciples, discussing the events on their walk, and to the listener of the cantata.

Bach first performed the cantata at the Thomaskirche on 10 April 1724. He performed the cantata again in Leipzig, on 26 March 1731 and probably on 11 April 1735.

Music

Structure and scoring 
Bach structured the cantata in six movements. He used the final movement of the earlier work for the opening movement of the Easter cantata: The following four movements remained in the same sequence, the other movements were replaced by a closing chorale. The outer movements are choral, framing recitatives and arias  of the soloists, one set of recitative and aria as a duet. Bach scored the work for three vocal soloists (alto (A), tenor (T) and bass (B)), a four-part choir, and a Baroque instrumental ensemble: trumpet (Tr), two oboes (Ob), two violins (Vl), viola (Va), and basso continuo (Bc) including bassoon (Fg). The duration of the piece has been stated as 32 minutes.

In the following table of the movements, the scoring follows the Neue Bach-Ausgabe. The keys and time signatures are taken from the book by Bach scholar Alfred Dürr, using the symbol for common time (4/4). The instruments are shown separately for winds and strings, while the continuo, playing throughout, is not shown.

Movements

1 
The exuberant first movement was derived from the final movement of the secular cantata. It opens with a virtuoso orchestral introduction of 24 measures, depicting vital joy. First the alto shouts: "" (Rejoice, you hearts), the tenor continues "" (fade away, you sorrows), then all voices proclaim in homophony: "" (the Savior lives and rules within you). The middle section is given mostly to alto and tenor, who illustrate mourning and fear in a sorrowful "series of poignant descending chromatic passages and suspensions", although the words speak of the chasing away these moods: "" (You can drive away mourning, fear, anxious despair).

The continuo plays repeated "trembling" notes, a "heartbeat" as Bach would use later in the tenor recitative "" (O pain! Here trembleth the tormented heart).of his St Matthew Passion. Finally the choir enters, one voice after the other building a chord, gently adding words of consolation: "" (the Savior revives his spiritual kingdom). The instruments throw in motifs of the introduction, leading to the recapitulation of the first section. The movement has been termed "one of the longest and most exhilarating of Bach’s early works".

2 
The bass summarizes in a short recitative, accompanied by the strings: "" (The grave is broken and with it our suffering).

3 
The bass continues in an aria, "" (Let a song of thanks ring forth to the Highest). Music in dancing motion complements a general request to thank God in song. The middle section juxtaposes a long note over six measures on "" (peace) and coloraturas on "" (live).

4 
Movement four is begun by the tenor (Hope), who also wants to sing of victory and thanks (""). He starts it "" (My eye beholds the Savior reawakened), with a long melisma showing the reawakening. But already after one measure the alto (Fear) imitates the phrase on the words "" (No eye beholds ...). After singing together extendedly, the two different viewpoints are rendered in an argument, termed "a linear discourse as in conventional conversation", ended by the alto trying to believe: "" (I believe, but help my weakness).

5 
In the following duet the voices are homophonic for most of the time, but with little rhythmical differences, showing their different attitude to the darkness of the grave: the alto expresses "" (I truly fear) on steady long notes, whereas the tenor tells in ornamented figuration "" (I do not fear). In the continuation they also deviate only on one word, "" (lamented) in the alto, "" (hoped) in the tenor. The flowing 12/8 time signature of the duet and a virtuoso solo violin are reminiscent of the original purpose of the music in the congratulatory cantata. It is most fitting for the middle section of the da capo form, when both voices agree: "" (Now my heart is full of comfort).

6 
The cantata is closed by the second part of the hymn "", starting with a threefold Alleluja. It was derived in the 12th century from the Easter sequence Victimae paschali laudes, originally codified by Wipo of Burgundy around 1040. The verses underwent a substantial transformation by Martin Luther with the help of Johann Walter and were printed by Joseph Klug, Wittenberg, in 1533.

Recordings 
The selection is taken from the listing on the Bach Cantatas Website. Instrumental groups playing period instruments in historically informed performances are highlighted green under the header "".

Notes

References

Cited sources 
General
 

Books

 

Online sources

External links 
 
 BWV 66 Erfreut euch, ihr Herzen: English translation, University of Vermont
 James Leonard: Cantata No. 66, "Erfreut euch, ihr Herzen," BWV 66: Allmusic
 Luke Dahn: BWV 66.6 bach-chorales.com

Church cantatas by Johann Sebastian Bach
1724 compositions
Music for Easter